Jämtland County or Region Jämtland held a regional council election on 9 September 2018, on the same day as the general and municipal elections.

Results
The number of seats remained at 55 with the Social Democrats winning the most at 18, a drop of three from 2014.

Municipalities

Images

References

Elections in Jämtland County
Jämtland